Robert Blaschka (born 7 April 1958) is an Austrian former fencer. He competed at the 1984 and 1992 Summer Olympics.

References

External links
 

1958 births
Living people
Austrian male fencers
Austrian foil fencers
Olympic fencers of Austria
Fencers at the 1984 Summer Olympics
Fencers at the 1992 Summer Olympics
Sportspeople from Graz